Bombay Blasts may refer to several events in history:

 Bombay Explosion (1944) — the 1944 accident involving the freighter SS Fort Stikine 
 1993 Bombay bombings — the 1993 terrorist attack 
 11 July 2006 Mumbai train bombings
 13 July 2011 Mumbai bombings